San Sebastián railway station, also known as Donostia-San Sebastián or Estación del Norte is the main railway station of the Spanish city of San Sebastián, Basque Country. It served over 2 million passengers in 2018.

Services
Alvia services use the Madrid–León high-speed rail line as far as Valladolid-Campo Grande, and switches to the conventional rail network to serve Vitoria-Gasteiz and San Sebastián before reaching Irun. The Barcelona Sants to Irun Alvia service uses the Madrid–Barcelona high-speed rail line to Zaragoza-Delicias before switching to conventional tracks to San Sebastián. The Cercanías San Sebastián commuter rail line also serves the station.

At present, no connection exists to Bilbao by Renfe tracks; however travel between the two cities by the Euskotren Trena metre-gauge network is provided between Matiko station in Bilbao and Donostia-Amara station.

Future
The Basque Y high-speed rail network will connect San Sebastián station to Vitoria-Gasteiz and Bilbao-Abando in 34 and 38 minutes respectively.

References

Railway stations in Spain opened in 1864
Railway stations in San Sebastián